Edmund Timothy Spillane (5 January 1905 – 2 December 1991) was a New Zealand professional rugby league footballer who played in the 1920s and 1930s, and coached in the 1930s.

Spillane played in Canterbury's 26–66 defeat by Auckland in the 1928 New Zealand rugby league season Northern Union Cup in Auckland. Having become a well-known player and five-eighth for the Marist senior team, he signed on with English club Wigan in October 1929.

Spillane played  in Dominion XIII's 6–3 victory over France at Stadium Municipal, Toulouse on Sunday 21 March 1937.

He worked as an assistant coach at Bradford before being appointed Bramley's head coach.

Personal life
Spillane married Edith Coyle in Bradford in April 1938. The marriage caused Spillane to be sued for breach of promise by Lily Prust to whom Spillane had previously been engaged. At trial, in July 1938 at Bradford County Court, Miss Prust claimed that she and Spillane had become engaged in 1937 and were at the time of Spillane's marriage still engaged. Spillane asserted that the engagement to Miss Prust had ended by mutual agreement.  The jury found in Miss Prust's favour and awarded her £67 10s in damages.

The damages award forced Spillane to petition for his own bankruptcy in October 1938.  The bankruptcy was not discharged until 1956 when a dividend of 4s 1d in the pound (21%) was paid.
 
Spillane died on 2 December 1991, and was buried at the Killingbeck Roman Catholic Cemetery.

References

External links
Statistics at wigan.rlfans.com
Photograph "Ted Spillane - Ted Spillane, a Kiwi who captained Northern making 101 appearances. - Date: 01/01/1935" at rlhp.co.uk

1905 births
1991 deaths
Bradford Bulls players
Bramley R.L.F.C. coaches
Canterbury rugby league team players
Dominion XIII rugby league team players
Keighley Cougars players
New Zealand rugby league coaches
New Zealand rugby league players
Rugby league centres
Rugby league five-eighths
Rugby league halfbacks
Rugby league wingers
Rugby league players from Dunedin
Wigan Warriors players